The fourteenth season of CSI: Crime Scene Investigation premiered on September 25, 2013, on CBS, and ended on May 7, 2014. The season stars Ted Danson and Elisabeth Shue.

Production
The series's 300th episode aired during the season, with Marg Helgenberger guest starring in the landmark episode in a series of newly recorded "flashbacks" to a case that occurred in the time frame of the first season. Due to the leave of absence taken by George Eads following his altercation with a writer, he appears only in the first three episodes of the season, under the pretext of receiving special training in Quantico. Eads returned in the episode "Check In and Check Out". The season also introduced a redesigned title sequence.

On February 18, 2014, CBS announced plans to launch a new spin-off of the CSI franchise, tentatively titled CSI: Cyber, with a backdoor pilot episode, entitled "Kitty", that aired April 30, 2014. Inspired by producer Mary Aiken's work as a cyber-psychologist, the new series revolves around Special Agent Avery Ryan, played by Patricia Arquette, who is in charge of the Cyber division at FBI Headquarters in Washington, D.C. The show was officially picked up by CBS on May 9, 2014. On March 13, 2014, it was announced that CSI: Crime Scene Investigation would return for a fifteenth season, which started airing in September 2014.

Plot
D.B. and Finn lead the hunt for Morgan, while Brody makes a shocking discovery that endangers her own life ("The Devil and D.B. Russell"), in the fourteenth season of CSI. Also this season the team investigate the unusual, the brutal, and the life-changing, including a casino heist ("Take the Money and Run"), a night-club fire ("Torch Song"), a contact lens discovered on a cookery show ("Last Supper"), a cold case that takes the team, and Willows, back to 2000 ("Frame by Frame"), the death of a homeless man ("Passed Pawns"), a body in a human hamster ball ("Helpless"), a stabbing at a hotel ("Check In and Check Out"), the murder of Santa ("The Lost Reindeer"), a petty crime on a plane ("Keep Calm and Carry On"), a car-crash ("Boston Brakes"), a murder in Mexico ("De Los Muertos"), and the death of a sixteen year old ("Love for Sale"). Meanwhile, Greg is accused of framing a man seven years ago ("Under a Cloud"), Sara, Morgan and Finn head to a spa ("Girls Gone Wild"), D.B. is taken hostage ("The Fallen"), the team track a cannibal ("Consumed"), and Brass has to make a decision when his daughter attempts suicide ("Dead In His Tracks"). Avery Ryan, meanwhile, heads to Las Vegas to work alongside the CSI team when a casino owner's wife is killed in a cyber-related case ("Kitty").

Cast

Changes
Paul Guilfoyle, who plays Jim Brass, left the series at the end of the 14th season. Marg Helgenberger guest stars, Patricia Arquette makes her franchise debut as Avery Ryan.

Main cast

Recurring
 Marc Vann as Conrad Ecklie
 Matthew Davis as Sean Yeager
 Larry M. Mitchell as Officer Mitchell

Guest stars
 Marg Helgenberger as Catherine Willows
 John de Lancie as General Robert Landsdale
 Patricia Arquette as Avery Ryan
 John Ratzenberger as Stu Kirchoff (episode 3)
 Catrinel Marlon as Elisabetta, Hodges' fiancé (episode 4)
 Wolfgang Puck as himself (episode 4)
 Lea Thompson as Jennifer Rhodes (episode 7)
 Sherilyn Fenn as Madame Suzanne (episode 15) 
 Ron Glass as Paul Lomax (episode 16)
 Gene Simmons as himself (episode 17)

Episodes

U.S. Nielsen ratings

References

General references

External links
 

14
2013 American television seasons
2014 American television seasons